A knuckle is a joint on the hand.

Knuckle or knuckles may also refer to:

Places
 Knuckles Mountain Range, Sri Lanka

People with the name
 Knuckles Boyle (1909-1943), American football player
 Frankie Knuckles (1955–2014), American  DJ, record producer, and remixer

Biology and anatomy
 Knuckles, the dorsal crenulations (bumps) of the gray whale where most whales have a dorsal fin
 Knuckle-walking,  a form of quadrupedal walking in which the forelimbs hold the fingers in a partially flexed posture that allows body weight to press down on the ground through the knuckle
 Pork knuckle, a part of a pig's leg used as the basis of the traditional German dish Eisbein

Arts, entertainment, and media
Knuckle (film) a 2011 documentary about bare knuckle boxing in Ireland
Knuckle Bine, a character from the anime/manga series Hunter × Hunter
Knuckles the Echidna, a fictional character from the Sonic the Hedgehog video game series
Knuckles the Echidna (comics), American comic book series

Implements
 Brass knuckles (also sometimes called knuckles, knucks, brass knucks, knucklebusters, knuckledusters, an English punch, or a classic), weapons used in hand-to-hand combat
 Knuckle coupler, a railway coupling, a mechanism for connecting rolling stock in a train
 Knuckle joint (mechanical), used to connect the two rods which are under the tensile load

Other uses
 Knuckleball, or knuckler, a baseball pitch thrown to minimize the spin of the ball in flight, causing an erratic, unpredictable motion

See also
 Knuckle Sandwich (disambiguation)